Jerry Franklin is the President and Chief Executive Officer (CEO) of CPBI which includes CPTV and WNPR in Hartford, Connecticut.

Early life
Jerry Franklin was born to Jasper Remer Franklin Sr., a veteran of the United States Army, and Myrtis H. Franklin of Candler County, Georgia. Franklin married Ida Durden-Franklin of Metter, Georgia.

Education
Jerry Franklin received a B.S. in Political Science and Journalism from Georgia Southern University and a Master of Arts in Telecommunications Management from Indiana University.

Career

Military service
Jerry Franklin received an Honorable Discharge from the United States Air Force in 1970.

CPBI
In 1985, Jerry Franklin was appointed to the position of President and CEO of CPBI. Franklin is also a director of People's United Bank, and serves on the Board of Trustees for the Hartford Stage, the Hartford Club, and the Connecticut Boy Scouts Executive Council.

References

Georgia Southern University alumni
Indiana University alumni
American chief executives in the media industry
Living people
Year of birth missing (living people)